Rodolphe Kreutzer (15 November 1766 – 6 January 1831) was a French violinist, teacher, conductor, and composer of forty French operas, including La mort d'Abel (1810).

He is probably best known as the dedicatee of Beethoven's Violin Sonata No. 9, Op. 47 (1803), known as the Kreutzer Sonata, though he never played the work. Kreutzer made the acquaintance of Beethoven in 1798, when at Vienna in the service of the French ambassador, Jean-Baptiste Bernadotte (later King of Sweden and Norway). Beethoven originally dedicated the sonata to George Bridgetower, the violinist at its first performance, but after a quarrel he revised the dedication in favour of Kreutzer.

Biography 
Kreutzer was born in Versailles, and was initially taught by his German father, who was a musician in the royal chapel, with later lessons from Anton Stamitz. He became one of the foremost violin virtuosos of his day, appearing as a soloist until 1810. He was a violin professor at the Conservatoire de Paris from its foundation in 1795 until 1826. He was co-author of the Conservatoire's violin method with Pierre Rode and Pierre Baillot, and the three are considered the founding trinity of the French school of violin playing. For a time, Kreutzer was leader of the Paris Opera, and from 1817 he conducted there, too. He died in Geneva and is buried in Paris at the Père Lachaise Cemetery.

Work 
Kreutzer was well known for his style of bowing, his splendid tone, and the clearness of his execution. His compositions include nineteen violin concertos and forty operas. His best-known works, however, are the 42 études ou caprices (42 études or capricci, 1796) which are fundamental pedagogic studies.

References

External links 

1766 births
1831 deaths
18th-century classical composers
19th-century classical composers
18th-century conductors (music)
19th-century conductors (music)
18th-century French male classical violinists
19th-century French male classical violinists
Academic staff of the Conservatoire de Paris
Burials at Cimetière des Rois
French male classical composers
French male conductors (music)
French conductors (music)
French educators
French people of German descent
French opera composers
Male opera composers
People from Versailles
French Classical-period composers
String quartet composers
Violin pedagogues
French Romantic composers
19th-century French composers
18th-century French composers